Tymor Yr Heliwr is the second album by the Welsh rock band Crys. It was released in 1982 on the Sain record label and was available on LP and Cassette. It is no longer in print.

Track listing 
All tracks written by Liam Forde and Crys except "Mae fy Nghalon yn Rhydd", written by Caryl Ifans.

Personnel 

Liam Forde (Vocals, Rhythm Guitar)
Scott Forde (Bass)
Nicky Samuel (Drums)
Alun Morgan (Lead Guitar)
Caryl Ifans (Backing Vocals)

References 

Crys albums
Welsh-language albums
1982 albums